Marquis Cornwallis may refer to a number of ships named for Charles Cornwallis, 1st Marquess Cornwallis:
 , a 654 burthen ton merchantman that made a voyage transporting convicts to Australia.
 was a brig launched at Sunderland. She traded widely, to the West Indies, the Iberian peninsula, and the Baltic. The American privateer  captured her in 1814 but released her as a cartel. She was wrecked in 1823.

Ship names